Our Lady of Peñafrancia is an image of the Blessed Virgin Mary in the Philippines. The Marian image is permanently enshrined  in the Minor Basilica of Our Lady of Peñafrancia in Naga, Camarines Sur.

Pope Benedict XV issued a pontifical decree of coronation granted to the Bishop of Nueva Caceres, John Bernard MacGinley on 13 May 1920. The coronation was carried out by Bishop Guglielmo Piani on 20 September  1924. A mosaic of the image is enshrined at the Vatican Gardens.

History 
The devotion to Our Lady of Peñafrancia originates from the province of Salamanca, Spain. The statue of Our Lady of Peñafrancia located in Naga originates from Our Lady of Peña de Francia enshrined in Peña de Francia, Salamanca, Spain.

According to locals, a Spanish government official from Peña de Francia, Spain, a native of San Martin de Castañar, settled with his family in Cavite in the early 1680s. One day, Miguel Robles de Covarrubias, a son of that Spanish official and a seminarian studying at the Universidad de Santo Tomas, Manila, became seriously ill. He found a painting of an image found by Simon Vela, and would place the painting on whatever part of his body that greatly pained him. This gave him relief from his suffering. “So many are the miracles that have happened that I cannot count them. All I could say is that I am a miracle of her miracles.”  Miguel wrote. He and his family prayed to Our Lady of Peña de Francia whose picture he clutched to his breast as he hoped for recovery. In gratitude to her, he built a small church made of nipa at the small riverlet near the Pasig River containing the first copy of painting of Pena de Francia (which is now the Nuestra Senora de Penafrancia situated in Paco, Manila), done on canvas in the 1690s (or earlier). After that, he was invited to Ciudad de Nueva Caceres (present day Naga City) and ordained to the priesthood by Bishop Andres Gonzalez OP.
A lot of miraculous events happened in Naga during this period. One of the most prominent story is about a dog killed, its neck slashed and its blood used to coat or paint the newly carved replica of the statue of Our Lady of Peña de Francia (now the replica in Naga) made by a local artisan ordered by Miguel. The dead dog was dumped into the river, but it swam alive once again, as witnessed by hundreds of people, including some Dominican Fathers who were then vacationing as guests of Bishop Gonzales.

Many other miracles that happened were attributed to Our Lady, and the news spread like wildfire. Thus, the devotees also increased in number. She became more popular not only with the natives but also with the Chinese community. These were all documented in Father Miguel's letters of 1710 and 1711. His letter to the Dominican Fathers of Salamanca, Spain (in the convent of the Santuario de la Virgen de la Pena de Francia in 1712 reported many miracles through the intercession of Our Lady. As the devotees grew in number, the devotion also spread outside the Diocese of Nueva Caceres, which before comprised not only the Bicol region, but also included Tayabas (now Quezon), Marinduque, Laguna up to Palanan, Isabela along the Cordillera ranges.

When the Most Rev. Francisco Gainza, OP, DD, arrived in Naga in 1863 to take possession of the See of Nueva Caceres, foremost among his priorities was the spread of devotion. In the dedication of the book he himself authored, he wrote that even before he set foot on the streets of the city, he had helped in the spread of the devotion by facilitating the imprimatur of the Novena to Our Lady. After seeing the sad state of the church and upon learning that the image was temporarily housed at the cathedral, he sought the renovation of the church to be the permanent home of the Lady. Through a decree he issued on September 1, 1864, Bishop Gainza institutionalized the Traslación Procession on the Friday before the Feast of the Holy Name of Mary, where the image is brought to the Cathedral through a procession for the 9-day solemn Novena, then on the afternoon of the 9th day, Saturday, the image is brought back through the “Traslación por el rio”, now known as the Fluvial Procession, to her sanctuary for the celebration of Principal Feast day on the next day, Sunday.

Date of the feast 
In 1895, the Holy Father Leo XIII, acting on the petition of the Clergy and Faithful of the Diocese of Nueva Caceres led by Most Rev. Arsenio del Campo, DD coursed through the Sacred Congregation of Rites, issued a Rescript fixing the Feast day of Our Lady of Peñafrancia on the First Sunday of July and declaring the same as the Principal Patron of the City of Nueva Caceres dated June 4 and 10,on the same year.

But in 1905, the Holy Father Pius X, through a Rescript dated April 8 of the same year, granted the wishes of the Faithful of Nueva Caceres led by Most Rev. Jorge I. Barlin, DD (the first native Filipino Bishop in the Philippines) that the Solemnity of Our Lady of Peñafrancia be permanently assigned to the Sunday after the Octave of the Nativity of the same Blessed Virgin. This transfer of the Peñafrancia Festivities from July to September is the tradition that remains today.

In Spain, the celebration of the Feast of Nuestra Señora de la Peña de Francia is fixed on September 8 as contained in the Santoral Romano Catolico Tradicional

Thus, to determine the annual day of the Solemnity of Our Lady of Peñafrancia in Bicol, the point of departure is still the Nativity of Mary on September 8. The Solemnity is celebrated on the Sunday after the octave of the Nativity of Mary, that is, the Sunday after September 15. The Traslación which marks the start of the Novenary is held on the afternoon of the Friday ten days before, and the Fluvial Procession on the Saturday, the eve of the Solemnity.

Pontifical  coronation
On 20 September  1924, the image was canonically crowned by the Apostolic Delegate, Monsignor William Piani, at the Naga Cathedral. The American Bishop of Nueva Caceres, John Bernard MacGinley with the help of the La Assocacion Mariana de Peña de Francia (Now, the Our Lady of Peñafrancia Association, OLPA), petitioned the Benedict XV for the Canonical Coronation.

Having fulfilled the two requirements of antiquity and miracles, a decree was issued by the Vatican Chapter of Saint Peter's Basilica that favorably approved the petition on 13 May  1920. Although the coronation happened four years later, With Bishop McGinley already assigned to California, United States, Father  Francisco Reyes, the Diocesan Administrator spearheaded the celebrations.

Hymn 
Part of the preparations for the coronation was the Contest for Best Musical Composition. The winning piece, “Himno a la Nuestra Señora de Peñafrancia", composed by the Spanish priest, Rev. Fr. Maximo Juguera, CM, became the Anthem of the Coronation and, thereon, of every annual Fiesta. The Bikol translation of the hymn was done by Most Rev. Teotimo Pacis, CM, DD with the help of Bicolano priests, Rev. Fathers. Jesus Esplana and Sohl Saez.

Basilica 
In the year 1960, the first Archbishop of Caceres, Most Rev. Pedro P. Santos, DD, dreamt of building a new and bigger Church to be a Basilica and permanent sanctuary of the Lady of Peñafrancia in Bicol. But he died in 1965 and so the task was assumed by his successor, Most Rev. Teopisto V. Alberto, DD.

Meanwhile, on October 30, 1973, the Shrine was created into a Parish with the Auxiliary Bishop of Caceres, Most Rev. Concordio Sarte, DD as the first Parish Priest.

Theft of the image 
On August 15, 1981, at around 4:30 in the morning, the caretaker of the Peñafrancia Shrine discovered that the image of Our Lady of Peñafrancia had disappeared. The police reported that the culprits sawed the iron grills at the back of the church and took the image. The identity of the thieves remained a mystery; with the leading theory that they were selling to a black market of valuable items. The manto and the steel bar which held the image were found on the cemetery grounds of Peñafrancia Shrine without the image. In May 1982, an antique dealer and also a Peñafrancia devotee, Francisco Vecin, acquired information suggesting a man in Mabini St. of Malate, Manila, was selling the image, with it allegedly in the hands of a friend at that time. He reported to Florencio Yllana that the lost image was located in Cebu. On September 3, 1982, the image was turned over to Francisco in a sealed box. The image was returned in Naga on September 8, 1982, the Feast of the Nativity of Mary. Following the theft, officials opted for the production of a replica to be used in the 1981 Peñafrancia celebrations. Today, the original image is enshrined in the Peñafrancia Museum, which forms part of the basilica complex along Balatas Street in Naga City, which was built to accommodate the rising numbers of devotees from the Bicol region, as well as nationwide starting in the late 1970s. The replica is used in all of the major processions.

The Tercentenary Celebration 

In 2010, the devotion marked its 300th year.

The Archdiocese of Caceres outlined a three-year preparation for the tercentenary with each year centered on a particular theme and objective.
Year 1 (September 2007 to September 2008 ) the theme was “Remembering the Gift of the Devotion to Ina”, was dedicated to revisiting the history of the devotion in view of a deeper understanding of the same devotion.
Year 2 (September 2008 to September 2009) theme was “Renewing the Faith through Ina”, was dedicated to appreciating the devotees’ giftedness towards a more vibrant and relevant faith life.
Year 3 (September 2009 to September 2010) theme was “Sharing the Future in Hope”, was dedicated to envisioning the future with the intent of sharing the fruits of the devotion to the next generations.

In Year 4 (September 2010), the church in Bicol celebrated in thanksgiving the grace of 300 Years of Devotion. The overall theme of the celebration is “A Gift received, a Gift to share” (Balaog inako, Balaog itao).

The Peñafrancia festival
The Peñafrancia Festival, which has been described as the biggest Marian event in Asia, is a celebration of two feasts—Divino Rostro (Divine Face of Jesus) on the second Friday of September, and the Our Lady of Peñafrancia the next weekend.

Considered the biggest and most popular religious event in the Philippines, the September festivities of the Lady and Mother of Bicol form an opening salvo to the long celebrations of Christmas in the Philippines, which begin on the month the celebrations are held in Bicol and in many other parts of the country. Tens of thousands of pilgrims, devotees, and tourists come to Naga City, Philippines every September for the novena festivities in honor of Our Lady of Peñafrancia, the Patroness of Bicol.

Feast day

The feast of Our Lady of Peñafrancia is celebrated on the third Saturday of September. Filipinos at home or abroad gather in to meet relatives and friends, to share food, drinks, and prayers with them, and to pay homage and make thanksgiving to the Virgin of Peñafrancia.

The feast day is preceded by a novena in honor of the Virgin. On the first day, the image of the Virgin, a copy of the Madonna in Peñafrancia, Spain, is brought from its shrine to the Metropolitan Cathedral and Parish of Saint John the Evangelist where the novena is held. On the last day, the image is returned to her shrine following the Naga River route. The evening procession is lit by thousands of candles from followers in boats escorting the image. When the flatboat reaches its destination, the devotees shout "Viva la Virgen" ("Long live the Virgin!") and the image is carried back in a procession to the cathedral. Amongst the cheers Bicolanos and pilgrims, holding lit candles in their hands, will kneel on the ground and bow their heads in prayer as the fluvial procession carrying the Virgin traverses the Bicol River in downtown Naga.

A multicolored pagoda carrying the images and icons of the Virgin of Peñafrancia and the Divino Rostro will pass along the Bicol River. The fluvial procession marks the return of the Virgin from the Naga Metropolitan Cathedral to her home shrine at the basilica. Upon its arrival, the Virgin will be received in formal religious rites by Roman Catholic dignitaries of the Bicol Region led by the Archbishop of Nueva Caceres, which is its home diocese.

Novena to the Divino Rostro or "The Divine Face"
The celebration begins with the Feast of the Nativity of Mary on September 8, which is marked by Masses in the old shrine or the Metropolitan Cathedral.

The feast of the Divino Rostro, which falls on the second Friday of September, is the first high point of the celebration. This is followed by a Novena honoring the Divino Rostro, a local icon of Holy Face commencing on the second Friday of September. Devotion to the Holy Face in Naga City began in 1882 with a cholera epidemic in Naga. According to legend, the epidemic subsided after the image of the Holy Face was placed at the altar of the cathedral.

The icon of the Holy Face is brought in procession from Our Lady of Peñafrancia Basilica to the old Peñafrancia Shrine, where it stays for nine days, with a usual focus on the sick. Generally, the first devotees begin their celebrations during this period. The "Hymn to the Divino Rostro" is sung at the end of services.

Traslación
The second Friday of September marks the feast day of the Divino Rostro, following the novena at the shrine. During the Traslacion procession, the images of the Lady of Peñafrancia and the Divino Rostro (Holy Face) are brought by barefooted male voyages from the basilica through the main streets of the city to the cathedral. This procession, which usually lasts 4 hours, welcomes thousands of devotees from all over Bicol and other parts of the country. The devotion started in 1710 when Fr. Miguel Robles de Covarrubias had an image carved, a chapel built and processions held in honor of the miraculous image of the Virgin of Peñafrancia to honor the many favors he is said to have received through the help of the Virgin, especially about his health.

The image of the Our Lady of Peñafrancia is transferred at dawn from Peñafrancia basilica to her old home for the Traslación in the afternoon. After the procession, a community and thanksgiving Mass celebrates the feast of the Divino Rostro. Bishops and delegates from other dioceses in the country then attend a Pontifical Mass, concelebrated by the Archbishop of Caceres outside the shrine.

The Traslación begins after the noon mass with the procession of students, delegates from other regions, teachers, government officials, and other professionals while the images are being prepared. At around three o'clock in the Afternoon, the Divino Rostro icon leaves the shrine and heads to Naga Cathedral. After a recital of the Rosary, the image of Our Lady of Peñafrancia follows, more slowly than the Divino Rostro. After two or three hours, the Divino Rostro icon arrives at the cathedral, and after an hour, the image of Our Lady enters via the Porta Mariae (Gate of Mary). A Solemn Pontifical Mass (first-day Novenary Mass) is celebrated after the procession at the Quadricentennial Arch at the cathedral grounds, in the conclusion of the Mass, the two images are transferred inside of the cathedral to begin the novena for Our Lady as the people sing Resuene Vibrante

Novena to the Our Lady of Peñafrancia
On the beginning of Traslación, the novena to the Our Lady starts at the cathedral. This celebration in itself is said to have healed attendants. The novena centers around Mary's intercession to Jesus and its set around a given theme for the year. During some of the days of the novena, dawn and evening processions are mounted within the vicinity of Naga wherein the images of both Our Lady and the Divino Rostro are brought out to the streets of the city. Believers vie for the honor of sponsoring novena masses and prayers at the Naga Cathedral during the novena days and the themes for the days are chosen by the Archdiocese.

Parades and celebrations
Different parades are held during the novena to the Our Lady. These events are open to the public, with coverage on radio and television as well as on online streaming. The Saturday following the Translacion, the citywide Marian Youth Congress is held, gathering young people from the city and region to share and strengthen their faith.

During the Sunday after the Traslacion, the majorettes, CAT, and Drum and Lyre Corps, plus marching bands, exhibit their dancing, music playing, and silent drill at the Robredo Coliseum, with the best in each category being announced at the end of the day's events. On the Tuesday before the Fluvial Procession, the Regional Cheer-dance Competition is held at the Robredo Coliseum, with almost all of the schools and universities in Bicol participating in the event.

On Wednesday, school contingents of the Boy Scouts and Girl Scouts of the Philippines, from elementary, high schools and senior high schools from all over the Bicol Region together with their school Drum and Lyre corps, drum majors and majorettes parade in the daylong, Regional BSP/GSP and Drum and Lyre Corps parade and competition at the Plaza Quezon. Awards are given to the best contingents and DLCs which have distinguished themselves.

On Thursday, the Civic Parade of the Government workers, and different associations and organizations in Bicol, along with the Float Parade that is joined by hundreds of floats honoring Ina, is held in the morning. In recent years, this has been followed in the afternoon by a street dance competition between schools in the city and the region at Plaza Quezon. The best float of the morning and the champion of the afternoon ritual dance showdown are awarded after the events.

On Friday, the popular and century-old military parade, performed by all high schools, senior high schools, colleges and universities of the Bicol region, as well as service personnel of the Philippine National Police, the Armed Forces of the Philippines, the Philippine Coast Guard and the Bureau of Fire Protection, parade in the major streets of Naga City. It is considered to be the longest military parade outside Manila due to its daylong, sometimes going past sundown, parade, and is one of the largest to be held in Southeast Asia, with an estimated 70,000 marchers, mostly youth and university cadets and students together with athletes. Dubbed the Bicol Region Military Parade, it is considered one of the highlights of the celebrations, with the mayor of Naga acting as the reviewing officer. Awards and decorations are handed out to the best contingents and bands at the end of the long parade.

Fluvial Procession

A fluvial procession at the end of the novena caps the feast. Following a farewell service at the Naga Metropolitan Cathedral, the images are both carried through the streets and then in a pagoda (the Filipino term for a decorated shrine-barge, usually with more than one tier, used in fluvial processions) on its return journey to the minor basilica, where a Pontifical Mass is held. Along the route, people shout "¡Viva La Virgen!" and people wave handkerchiefs and towels.

The images of both Our Lady and the Divino Rostro are escorted by a battalion of devotees, most of them aboard colorful paddle boats pulling the pagoda, and those who are privileged men joining the icons on the pagoda together with the bishops of Bicol and officials. Tradition holds that a woman riding on the pagoda during the September fluvial procession will spell disaster for everyone involved.

Festival Sunday
Festival masses held on the Sunday after the Octave of the Nativity of Mary at the Peñafrancia Minor Basilica mark the official termination of the festivities. Masses are held all day long in all the Catholic parishes and diocese cathedrals of the Bicol Region. In addition, masses are held in many parts of the country in her honor, organized by local devotees' associations.

On the Monday following the solemnity the schools that have won the championship as best contingents or bands in the Friday parade hold one final parade - a sort of victory parade - in their communities.

Changes in the Peñafrancia Fiesta celebration due to the COVID-19 Pandemic
With the ongoing threat of the COVID-19 pandemic in the Philippines, the Archdiocese of Caceres and the Naga City Government diminished thee scope of the 2020 festivities to comply with the minimum health standards implemented in the country.

As such, the following changes were observed for the celebrations:
Instead of the traditional novena to the Divino Rostro (the Holy Face of Jesus) from September 2 to 10 and the novena to Our Lady of Peñafrancia from September 11 to 19, at the Peñafrancia Shrine, Metropolitan Naga Cathedral, and the basilica minore, the practice of the devotion is encouraged in the homes of the faithful.
The annual Traslación and Flvuial Processions were canceled.
The fiesta mass on 20 September 2020 was streamed live from the Peñafrancia Basilica.
The other dioceses of Bicol were encouraged to hold noven masses on the same date as Naga, to deter people from coming to the city.
All civic and commercial activities that coincide with the feast, such as the Voyadores Festival, civic and military parades, trade fairs, exhibits, concerts, and other mass events were cancelled.

The same changes were adopted for the 2021 Peñafrancia Festivities from 01 to 19 September 2021. 2022 saw the return of the traditional celebrations with provisions to avoid COVID infections.

Patronage
The Virgin of Peñafrancia is patroness of the Bicol Region.

Elsewhere
The veneration of Our Lady of Peñafrancia is one of the oldest and largest Filipino Marian celebrations in San Diego, with almost 50 years of active celebration

Hymn
The "Himno a la Nuestra Señora de Peñafrancia" or "Resuene Vibrante" as Bicolanos call it, is the official hymn of the devotees to the Lady of Bicolandia composed by Fr. Maximo Huguera, CM in the year 1924. It won the first prize during the hymn-writing competition for the Lady's canonical coronation. This was translated to Central Bikol by Fr. Jesus Esplana and Fr. Sohl Saez, but was eventually replaced by the original Spanish text after the Tercentenary celebration in 2010.

Spanish text
Coro:
Resuene vibrante el himno de amor
Que entona tu pueblo con grata y emoción
Resuene vibrante el himno de amor
Que entona tu pueblo con grata emoción
Patrona del Bícol, Gran Madre de Dios
Sé siempre la Reina de Nuestra Región
Patrona del Bícol, Gran Madre de Dios
Sé siempre la Reina de Nuestra Región.

Estrofa I:

Los ríos murmuran tu nombre al correr
Los montes proclaman tu gloria y poder
El pueblo creyente con gozo te ve
Te canta amoroso y besa tu pie
El pueblo creyente con gozo te ve
Te canta amoroso y besa tu pie.

(Repeat Coro)

Estrofa II:

Patrona del Bicol altar del amor
Reliquia bendita que el cielo nos dio
Escucha benigna del pueblo el clamor
Que acude a tu Templo con fé y devoción
Patrona del Bicol altar del amor
Reliquia bendita que el cielo nos dio
Escucha benigna del pueblo el clamor
Que acude a tu Templo con fé y devoción.

(Repeat Coro)

Estrofa III:

Los pobres y tristes te buscan con fé
Te miran llorando les miras también
Al punto sus lágrimas se truscan en bien
Y a casa gozosos les vemos volver
Los pobres y tristes te buscan con fé
Te miran llorando les miras también
Al punto sus lágrimas se truscan en bien
Y a casa gozosos les vemos volver

(Repeat Coro)

Bicol text
I
Maski an kasalogan, Sambit an si'mong ngaran
Maski an kabukiran, Ika an rokyaw.
Kami si'mong aki, Pano' nin kaogmahan
Si'mong nangangako, Ika kamo'tan.
Kami si'mong aki, Pano' nin kaogmahan
Si'mong nangangako, Ika kamo'tan.

Chorus:
Awiton an awit nin pagkamoot
Sa saimo samuyang idinodolot
Awiton an awit nin pagkamoot
Sa saimo samuyang idonodolot.
Patrona nin Bikol, Ina ka nin Dios
Magdanay na Reina nin samuyang region,
Patrona nin Bikol, Ina ka nin Dios
Magdanay na Reina nin samuyang region.

II
Patrona nin Bikol, Inang mamomo'ton
Pamanang banal, Balaog nin Dios.
Pakihimatea mga inagrangay, Kan si'mong banwaan
na napaalaw.
Patrona nin Bikol, Inang mamomo'ton
Pamanang banal, Balaog nin Dios.
Pakihimatea mga inagrangay, Kan si'mong banwaan
na napaalaw.

(Repeat Chorus)

See also
 Penha de França
 Penha de França, Goa

References

Sources
 Rubio, T. N., Zantua, B., & Real, M. (2010, September/October). The Blue and Gold 	Special Commemorative Issue: 300 YEARS OF DEVOTION TO THE VIRGIN OF PEÑAFRANCIA [PDF]. Ateneo De Naga Junior High School. Retrieved from: 	http://jhs.adnu.edu.ph/jhs/gainpower/BG_300years_of_ina_commemorative_issue.pdf

External links
 Our Lady of Peñafrancia Basilica website
 Santuario de Nuestra Señora de la Peña de Francia – Spain

Catholic Church in the Philippines
Naga, Camarines Sur
Religion in Camarines Sur
Our Lady of Penafrancia
Marian devotions
Statues of the Madonna and Child